Bloons is a video game franchise developed by Ninja Kiwi. The games involve players using monkeys, armed with various weapons, to pop as many "bloons" (balloons) as possible. They include the Bloons series, the Bloons Tower Defense series, and several other spin-offs. Most of the earlier Bloons games are browser-based games that use Adobe Flash Player, although some are available on other platforms. Mobile games based on the Bloons series are distributed through the App Store, Google Play, and some through Steam. Games made by Ninja Kiwi older than Bloons TD 6 are available through the Ninja Kiwi Archive on Steam.

Development

The first Bloons game was developed by Stephen and Chris Harris, two brothers from New Zealand. Prior to working on Bloons, the pair had released Cash Sprinta successful racing game that incorporated weekly prizes. After the success of Cash Sprint, they developed their own web portal for flash games, but failed to gain the necessary traffic. Instead they decided to focus on their own games, and launched a websiteNinjakiwi.comwith five of their own games. The site was a success, and this led to their work on Bloons.

The basic concept for Bloons came from Stephen's wife. When Stephen asked her what would be fun in a new game, she brought up carnival games with darts and balloons. The first version was developed quickly, and the game was released in late March 2007. It proved popular, especially after being picked up by Digg, and soon reaching approximately 100,000 players per day. By 2011 the game had been played over 3 billion times.

Main series

Bloons 
The Bloons series is the original grouping of games developed under the "Bloons" name. In all of the main games, the goal is for the player to clear the playing area of all Bloons (which, as implied, have similar traits to balloons) using a limited number of darts. The player is able to choose the power, aim, and other factors involving the launch of darts; and hence the path it will follow and what Bloons it will pop. There are many sequels and spin-offs of this series, with large fan support (indicated by the "player packs" discussed later).

Gameplay 
The games consist of various levels, each with a different and unique layout of Bloons. On each, the player is given several darts used to pop the Bloons on the screen. The fewer darts the player uses, the better his or her score for that level. There is much strategy involved, especially since some Bloons have special powers or affect the player's darts in both helpful and hindering ways. For example, when a special Bloon is hit, they provide the player with 3 darts to fire at once during his next shot. Another one has an area blast effect (again, when hit) like a bomb. As new games in the series developed, more and more aspects of the game were expanded upon with many new Bloons and levels being introduced. There are also several "player packs"groups of levels developed by players of the Bloons series.

Games in the series 
 Bloons
 More Bloons
 Even More Bloons
 Bloons Insanity
 Bloons Junior
 Bloons 2
 Bloons 2 Christmas Pack
 Bloons 2 Spring Fling
 Bloons Player Pack (1–5)
 Bloons Pop 3

Bloons Tower Defense 

In the Bloons Tower Defense series (often abbreviated Bloons TD or BTD), the main objective of the game is to pop the enemy Bloons before they reach the end of the path on the game screen. The player has various types of towers available to defend against the Bloons, such as Dart Monkeys, Tack Shooters, and the powerful Super Monkey. There are also other types of towers, such as Ninja Monkeys and Sniper Monkeys, introduced in later versions of the game. Every tower can be purchased and upgraded with in-game money which is earned through various means.

There are many types of Bloons, the Red Bloon being the weakest; the tougher variants each contain one or more weaker ones, released when the containing Bloon is popped. For example, the Green Bloon contains a Blue Bloon, which contains a Red Bloon. Depending on the difficulty and version of the game, the player has a certain number of "lives" available. Different types of Bloons consume different numbers of lives if they escape, based on the total number of Bloons contained inside. Some Bloons have special attributes. Lead Bloons are immune to sharp things, black Bloons are immune to bombs, and white Bloons are immune to ice. There are special types of Bloons such as the infamous "MOAB-class" (Massive Ornary Air Blimp, some prefer to call it "Mother Of All Bloons") where the Bloon resembles an airship and takes many hits to defeat, an example being the ZOMG or BFB (Zeppelin Of Mighty Gargantuanness or Brutal Floating Behemoth). In general, the newer games have had more Bloon and tower types.

There have been six releases of the BTD series so far; the newest release, BTD6, came out 14 June 2018 on the App Store.

Bloons Monkey City
Bloons Monkey City is a free mobile game that combines the traditional Bloons TD with a city builder. Capturing more plots allows the player to place more buildings. Some buildings require specific tiles. The buildings cost in-game money, which are acquired from different buildings and by capturing tiles. Windmills and watermills create energy that is used by the player's other buildings. Leveling up allows the player to make more buildings and cities. Bloonstones, another valuable in-game resource, are used to unlock the strongest upgrades for towers. Special plots can contain MOABs, chests, camo Bloons, etc.

Bloons Super Monkey
Bloons Super Monkey (often abbreviated as BSM) is the second Bloons spin-off series to date; it is a bullet hell RPG with three installations so far.

The objective of the game is to move a super monkey that shoots a stream of darts to pop bloons. Popping them gives the player power blops, which are used to buy upgrades. If the monkey fails to pop the required amount of bloons for a certain level, the game is over. The super monkey wields weapons, which can be upgraded or replaced with a different weapon.

The first game, Bloons Super Monkey, was released on Ninja Kiwi's website in February 2010. In May 2013, a sequel, Bloons Super Monkey 2, was released on the same website. In November 2016, a refined version of Bloons Super Monkey 2 was released on the iOS App Store and Android Play Store for download.

Bloons Pop!
Bloons Pop! is a spin-off mobile game of the main Bloons series that incorporates elements of the Bloons TD series with puzzle gameplay.

Spin-off games 
In Hot Air Bloon, users must pop as many Bloons as possible without crashing into obstacles. Players have the option to save their scores to the High Score List with an existing Mochi Games account.
In Who Wants to Be a Bloonionaire, users answer ten questions in a similar style to Who Wants to be a Millionaire? with two hints. If they are all answered correctly, then a trailer of Bloons TD 5 is shown.

Reception 

Tech media website CNET reported favorably on the Bloons Tower Defense games for iPhone, describing it as having "nearly everything from the beloved Web-based classic". The article reflects negatively on the controls, stating that "[they] are a little finicky", but overall their impression is positive, saying that the game is an ideal introduction to the tower defense genre for young children.

References

External links
Ninja Kiwi official website

2007 video games
Browser games
Puzzle video games
Video game franchises introduced in 2007
Video games about primates
Video games developed in New Zealand